Alex Thomas Michael George (born September 27, 1938) is a retired American professional baseball player. He appeared in five Major League Baseball games at the age of 16 as a shortstop and pinch hitter for the Kansas City Athletics during the  season. He was signed by the Athletics during their first season in Kansas City out of Rockhurst, a local Jesuit high school. All of his Major League appearances took place before his 17th birthday. He struck out in his first Major League plate appearance against relief pitcher Al Papai of the Chicago White Sox, but four days later, on September 20, playing as the A's starting shortstop, he collected his only big league hit, a bunt single off Duke Maas of the Detroit Tigers.Sent to the minor leagues in 1956 for more experience, George never returned to the Majors. His playing career extended through 1963, mostly in the Kansas City system, where he played second base and  outfield as well as shortstop and reached double figures in home runs four times in eight seasons.

References

External links

1938 births
Living people
Albany Senators players
Albuquerque Dukes players
Baseball players from Kansas City, Missouri
Kansas City Athletics players
Lewiston Broncs players
Major League Baseball infielders
Pocatello A's players
Seminole Oilers players
Shreveport Sports players
Sioux City Soos players
York White Roses players